62-56 is an EP by the electronic band Electric Company. It was released in 2001 through Tigerbeat6.

Track listing

Personnel 
Brad Laner – instruments, production

References 

2001 EPs
Electric Company (band) albums
Tigerbeat6 EPs